Miriam Ottenberg (October 7, 1914 in Washington, D.C. – November 10, 1982) was the first woman news reporter for The Washington Star who won a Pulitzer Prize in 1960, for a series of articles exposing the practices of unscrupulous used car dealers in Washington D.C.

Background

Her father was Louis Ottenberg (1886–1960), a lawyer for 45 years in the District of Columbia, at whose suggestion the American Bar Association created the Magna Carta Memorial in Runnymede, England. Her mother was Nettie (Podell) Ottenberg, one of the first training social workers in the United States who won the first federal funding for day care.

Career

Ottenberg's follow-up stories led to enactment of remedial law.

With several honors and awards given during her career, Ottenberg also was one of the first reporters to reveal that the Mafia was an organized crime network. She once summed up her feelings about her role as a journalist: "A reporter should expose the bad and campaign for the good. That's the way I was brought up."

Awards and recognition 
 Co-winner of the Washington Newspaper Guild competition for public service articles in 1953
 Honorable mention awards in the same category in 1954 and 1958, and in 1959
 Pulitzer Prize in 1960 for best investigation report: “Buyer Beware”
 Bill Pryor Award of the Washington Newspaper Guild for her series on used car fraud, “Buyer Beware”
 First place in the local news category for her stories on an abortion ring and on murders of women
 In May 1958, capital police, jurists, and local and federal government officials held a party to pay tribute to Ottenberg's efforts against crime
 She was given awards for distinction by the National Council of Jewish Women in 1963 and by the American Association of University Women in 1975
 In 1979 she won the Hope Chest Award from the National Capital Chapter of the National MS Society

Works 
Ottenberg published the following books:
 The Warren Commission Report: The Assassination of President Kennedy Miriam Ottenberg
 The Pursuit of Hope Ottenberg, Miriam  
 The Federal Prosecutors (Prentice-Hall), a book about the FBI (1962)

References 

American people of Russian-Jewish descent
American people of Ukrainian-Jewish descent
American women journalists
Jewish American journalists
Pulitzer Prize for Investigative Reporting winners
1914 births
1982 deaths
20th-century American women writers
20th-century American non-fiction writers
20th-century American journalists
20th-century American Jews